Lennart Eisner (born 29 September 1941) is a Swedish sailor. He competed in the Dragon event at the 1968 Summer Olympics.

References

External links
 

1941 births
Living people
Swedish male sailors (sport)
Olympic sailors of Sweden
Sailors at the 1968 Summer Olympics – Dragon
Sportspeople from Gothenburg